Currently, Mercosur is composed of five full members (one of which is suspended), five associated countries and two observer countries:

Member states

  (1991)
  (1991)
  (1991)
  (1991)

Suspended members

  Associate state (2004), Protocol of Accession (2006), Full Member (2012), suspended (2016)

Associate states

  (1996) Protocol of Accession (2012)http://www.nasdaq.com/article/bolivia-formalizes-request-for-full-mercosur-membership-20121207-00577 
  (1996) 
  (2004)
  (2004)
  (2013)
  (2003)
  (2013)

Observer states

 
 

Guyana and Suriname signed framework agreements with Mercosur in July 2013 to become associate states.

Venezuela
Venezuela applied for membership, but its entry has not been ratified by Paraguay, although it was ratified by Argentina, Brazil and Uruguay. However, in June 2012 Paraguay was suspended from Mercosur for an alleged coup d'état and the violation of the Democratic Clause of Mercosur, so Venezuela's admission, already approved by the remaining members, became effective on July 31. Venezuela is considered a key member of the Mercosur due to its energy resources, including natural gas and oil. Venezuela is also an important economic market for Brazil because of a favorable balance of trade.

Ratification process in Brazil
The process was approved by the Brazilian Government, the Chamber of Deputies and the Senate. In May 2007, the Brazilian Senate asked Venezuela to reconsider the non-renewal of RCTV's license, an oppositionist television network. Venezuelan president Hugo Chávez responded by accusing the Brazilian Congress of being subservient to interests of the United States. The leader of the Brazilian Social Democracy Party in the Senate, senator Arthur Virgílio, stated that the party would try to prevent Venezuela's entry in Mercosur. On December 18, 2008, the Brazilian Chamber of Deputies approved by 265 votes, 61 against and 6 abstentions, Venezuela's bid for membership in Mercosur. The bill was forwarded to the Brazilian Senate, where it was still pending as of 31 May 2009, though Brazilian President Luiz Inácio Lula da Silva said he expected final approval by September. However, some members of the Senate condemned Hugo Chávez's alleged attacks on freedom of the press and expression in Venezuela. One senator Flexa Ribeiro said, "The Brazilian Senate needs to send a strong message in support of the reestablishment of full democracy in Venezuela." The decision could further delay Venezuela's entry into Mercosur.

In September 2009 President Luiz Inácio Lula da Silva said that he was confident the Senate would approve the entry of Venezuela and added that "There is no Senate opposition to the entry of Venezuela into Mercosur. What exists is a natural process of discussion by the senators who want to evaluate the pros and cons of the enlargement of Mercosur with Venezuela's entry." According to Lula, the expansion of the organisation will especially benefit the northern states of Brazil. The ambassador of Brazil in Caracas, Antonio Simões was called to Brasília to meet with 81 senators and explain the benefits of Venezuela's entry into Mercosur for Brazil.

On 15 December 2009, the Brazilian Senate ratified Venezuela's entry into Mercosur.

Ratification process in Paraguay

The government of Paraguay supports Venezuela's entry into Mercosur but this process is complicated by opposition from the right-wing Colorado Party. The party had ruled Paraguay for 61 years until 2008 and still controls Paraguay's Upper House whose support is needed to pass the bill. On March 4, 2009, the External Relations Commission of the Paraguayan Chamber of Senators could not approve a recommendation for Venezuela's bid for membership in Mercosur. The bill was later withdrawn by the Paraguayan government after it feared defeat in the Congress, after several legislators questioned Hugo Chávez's "commitment to democracy" following the closure of several media outlets in Venezuela. President Lugo called on Congress to avoid “prejudices” and not limit a country of millions of souls “to a single name”, after a June 2010 political agreement between the President's coalition and the Colorado party that renewed speakers at the Senate and the Lower House.

The Paraguayan Senate's block on Venezuela's membership was circumvented in June 2012, when the country was suspended from Mercosur for an alleged coup d'état and the violation of the Democratic Clause of Mercosur, so the admission of Venezuela (already approved by the other legislatures of Mercosur) became effective in July 2012.

Venezuela's membership in dispute
In August 2016, the presidents of Brazil, Argentina and Paraguay, while present in Rio de Janeiro for the Olympic Games, met to discuss suspending Venezuela from Mercosur. The three countries are in doubt about whether Venezuela is complying with the union's requirements for full membership, citing Human Rights violations among other issues.  Moreover, Venezuela was rejected from assuming the presidency of Mercosur by those three countries. Venezuela had four years to fully adapt to the trade bloc regulations and failed to do so, with the nation being suspended from Mercosur on 1 December 2016.

Later developments
On 5 August 2017, the foreign ministers of Argentina, Paraguay, Uruguay and Brazil affirmed that Venezuela's membership of Mercosur is suspended indefinitely in response to the "rupture of the democratic order" in that country following the 30 July 2017 Constituent Assembly elections. The bloc by-laws have no provision for expulsion. However, trade and migration policies stay without changes in order to avoid aggravating the social crisis. Brazilian Foreign Minister Aloysio Nunes said that Venezuela will remain suspended until the country "re-establishes democracy."

In January 2019, the opposition-majority National Assembly declared incumbent Nicolás Maduro's 2018 reelection invalid, entering a presidential crisis. During a July 2019 summit in Santa Fe, Argentina, the bloc called for "free, fair and transparent presidential elections, as soon as possible" in Venezuela. The presidents of the four member countries signed a statement expressing concern "for the grave crisis that Venezuela is going through, which is seriously affecting the humanitarian situation and human rights."

Accession applications
Bolivia and Ecuador have expressed interest to join the bloc. However, their membership in the Andean Community of Nations complicates such attempts. Peru's president Humala said in 2011 that Peru may be interested in joining in the future, but that the country was not yet ready to start the process due to economic reasons.

Bolivia
Bolivia's full participation in the Mercosur bloc has been under negotiation since June 2011. In December 2012, Bolivia signed an accession protocol to become a full member. Uruguay ratified the agreement in June 2014. In September 2014 Argentina approved Bolivia's entry, leaving only Brazil and Paraguay left to approve the agreement. Due to objections from Paraguay that the protocol was agreed to while it was under suspension from the organization, an amended protocol was agreed to in 2015.

Ecuador
Ecuador started negotiations to join Mercosur in May 2013.

References

 
.
Mercosur
Mercosur, Member states